Sleepy Lagoon is a 1943 American musical comedy film directed by Joseph Santley and featuring comedian Judy Canova and singer Dennis Day. The film was written by Prescott Chaplin, while Frank Gill, Jr. and George Carleton Brown wrote the screenplay. It was Canova's final feature for the Republic studios until 1951.

While closely coincident in time, the movie was entirely unrelated to the Sleepy Lagoon murder which led to the Zoot Suit Riots, nor to the song which lent its name to that incident.

Overview
The story deals with the travails of a newly elected female mayor, Judy Joyner (Canova), in a growing and mildly corrupt small town.  Horror film actor Rondo Hatton had a bit part as "Hunchback."

Cast
 Judy Canova as Judy Joyner
 Dennis Day as Lancelot Hillie
 Ruth Donnelly as Sarah Rogers
 Joe Sawyer as Lumpy
 Ernest Truex as Dudley Joyner
 Douglas Fowley as J. "The Brain" Lucarno
 Will Wright as Cyrus Coates
 Forrest Taylor as Samuel
 Kitty McHugh as Mrs. Small
 Eddie Chandler as Ticket Seller
 Herbert Corthell as Sheriff Bates
 Ellen Lowe as Mrs. Simms
 Jack Raymond as Joe, the Clown
 Margaret Reid as Mrs. Crumm
 Mike Riley as Bandleader
 Rondo Hatton as Hunchback (uncredited)

External links 
 

1943 films
1943 musical comedy films
1940s crime comedy films
American crime comedy films
American musical comedy films
American black-and-white films
1940s English-language films
American independent films
Republic Pictures films
Films directed by Joseph Santley
1940s independent films
1940s American films